The Campeonato Internacional de Verano, also known under its sponsored name Copa Bimbo, is an international exhibition football competition hosted in Montevideo, Uruguay since 2009. It features four teams: Uruguay's two major teams Nacional and Peñarol, and guest teams from Argentina (in 2011), Brazil (in 2009) and Paraguay (in 2010 and 2011). All matches are played at the Estadio Centenario in Montevideo, the home stadium of the Uruguay national team and the host of the 1930 FIFA World Cup Final. The tournament is produced and televised by Uruguayan telecommunications company Tenfield, and is sponsored by the Mexican bakery and food corporation Grupo Bimbo.

The 2009 tournament was won by Brazilian club Cruzeiro, and the 2010 and 2011 edition was won by Uruguayan club Nacional.

Results

Honours

Performances by team

Performances by country

References 

 Roberto Lagarde: La copa de verano empieza el viernes Deportes en Acción, 13.1.2010
 Santiago Reis: Copa Bimbo, Rec.Sport.Soccer Statistics Foundation, 2.9.2010

Copa Bimbo